James Young (May 24, 1835 – January 29, 1913) was an Ontario businessman, journalist and politician. He represented Waterloo South in the House of Commons of Canada as a Liberal member from 1867 to 1878.

Biography

Early life
He was born in Galt in Upper Canada in 1835, the son of Scottish immigrants. He worked with a local newspaper and then bought several newspapers in the area in 1853 which he continued to publish until around 1863. He also wrote articles for other journals in the province. He became a partner in a wheel factory at Galt and also served on the town council.

Family
James Young married Margaret McNaught, daughter of John McNaught and his wife (née Kirkpatrick), on February 11, 1858. The couple resided at "Thornhill" in Galt, Ontario.

Politics
In 1867, he was elected to the 1st Canadian Parliament for Waterloo South as a member of the Liberal Party; he was reelected in 1872 and 1874.

In 1879, he was elected to represent Brant North in the Legislative Assembly of Ontario. He was appointed Treasurer and Commissioner of Agriculture in 1883, but resigned these posts later that year due to ill health. He opposed reciprocity in trade with the United States and supported an elected Senate.

Later life
After he retired from politics in 1886, he wrote a number of books dealing with Canadian history and politics, including Public men and public life in Canada, being recollections of parliament and the press, published in 1902. He died in Galt in 1913.

Electoral record

Works

References

External links
 
 
 
 Ontario Heritage Trust Plaque

1835 births
1913 deaths
Canadian people of Scottish descent
Young, James 1835-1913
Liberal Party of Canada MPs
Members of the House of Commons of Canada from Ontario
Ontario Liberal Party MPPs
People from Cambridge, Ontario